Two Tickets to Paradise is a 2006 comedy film directed by D. B. Sweeney in his directorial debut. It stars John C. McGinley, Sweeney, and Paul Hipp as three lifelong friends who go on a road trip to escape dissatisfaction with their lives.

Synopsis
The story revolves around three 40-ish lifelong friends from Pennsylvania who go on a road trip in search of themselves. The friends have just two tickets to a major college bowl game in Florida, and along the way the friends run into a few surprises, and some serious self-discovery.

Production
Sweeney decided to make the film after visiting a friend, a New York City firefighter who survived the 9/11 attacks. When Sweeney suggested to his friend that going to see a movie might cheer him up, his friend replied, "They don’t make movies for guys like us."

Filming locations included Interstate 95 and the San Diego area.

Music
The film includes music by Stevie Ray Vaughan, Dire Straits, Bruce Springsteen, Bob Dylan and American Minor. Springsteen in particular agreed to lend his music to the film because he was a fan of the film Eight Men Out, which starred Sweeney.

Cast
 John C. McGinley as Mark Hewson
 D. B. Sweeney as Billy McGriff
 Paul Hipp as Jason Klein
 Janet Jones Gretzky as Sherry, Mark's wife
 Tristan Gretzky as Hayden, Mark's son
 Pat Hingle as Mr. Hewson, Mark's terminally ill father
 Moira Kelly as Kate
 Ed Harris as Melville
 Nina Kaczorowski as Scarlet
 M. C. Gainey as Barbosa
 Rex Linn as Karl

The cast also includes ESPN reporter Jenn Brown as a Hooters waitress, and cameos by Vanna White as herself, Gerald McGinley, John's father, as the dentist, and Jean Jones, Janet Jones' mother, as her mother. The movie was Pat Hingle’s final film.

Release

The film premiered at the Method Fest Independent Film Festival on April 6, 2006 and went on to play the film festival circuit. It was released on DVD in June 2008 by First Look International. It was re-released on DVD in 2010.

External links

References

2006 films
2006 comedy films
2006 directorial debut films
2006 independent films
2000s comedy road movies
American buddy comedy films
American comedy road movies
Films directed by D. B. Sweeney
Films set in Pennsylvania
Films shot in Florida
Films shot in North Carolina
Films shot in California
Films about alcoholism
Midlife crisis films
2000s buddy comedy films 
2000s English-language films
2000s American films